The 2023 general election in Paraguay is scheduled to take place on 30 April 2023. This will be the 8th election to occur, since the 1989 Paraguayan coup d'état that ended the dictatorship of Alfredo Stroessner in February 1989. Incumbent president Mario Abdo Benítez and vice president Hugo Velázquez Moreno of the Colorado Party are ineligible from seeking re-election. The president-elect will take office on 15 August 2023.

Electoral system
The President of Paraguay is elected in one round of voting by plurality. The 80 members of the Chamber of Deputies are elected by closed list proportional representation in 18 multi-member constituencies based on the departments. The 45 members of the Senate are elected from a single national constituency using closed list proportional representation.

Candidates

Opinion polls

Pre-election polling

References

Presidential elections in Paraguay
Paraguay
Elections in Paraguay
Future elections in South America